Smith and Snipes Hall Farm Ltd v River Douglas Catchment Board [1949] 2 KB 500 is an English land law and English contract law appeal decision. The case, decided by Denning LJ, confirmed positive covenants can supplant privity of contract in contracts to improve land and secondly a covenant should be implied where the contract shows an intention that the obligation would attach to the land. The case thirdly held in that context, a somewhat uncertain description of lands which was capable of being rendered certain by extrinsic evidence was sufficient to enforce the covenant.

Facts
The River Douglas Catchment Board agreed with a number of landowners of certain westerly land between the River Douglas and the Leeds and Liverpool Canal to carry out some work if some contribution to the cost was given. In 1940 Mrs S, one of the covenantees, sold her land ("Low Meadows") to Smith, which incorporated Snipes Hall Farm Ltd in 1944 as his agricultural tenant. In Autumn 1946 the Eller Brook burst its banks and flooded Smith and Snipes Hall Farm land. They made a claim against the Board for damages in breach of contract (and in tort, not considered on the facts).

Legal questions arising
There was never any question that the main damage was suffered by the tenant and the tenant had the same locus standi as the landlord, exercising under a lease from time to time his legal rights. The question of liability in tort was not considered, instead a few words were said if that question had to be considered by the court (obiter dicta).  The question was whether not having been privy to the original agreement was a bar to any recovery.

Judgment
The Court of Appeal all held that the Board was in breach of contract, and that breach caused damage to the farm. The agreement showed the intention that the obligation would attach to the land, and it would not matter whose hands the land came into: the owner could enforce the covenant. Because the covenant ran with the land, under section 78 Law of Property Act 1925 it could be enforced by the covenantee and successors in title. Denning LJ's notable decision went as follows.

See also

English contract law
English property law
English tort law
Beswick v Beswick

Notes

References

Lord Denning cases
English contract case law
English privity case law
1949 in British law
Court of Appeal (England and Wales) cases
1949 in case law
English land case law
June 1949 events in the United Kingdom